The Hybrid Exit is a special move to take the paddle out of the water in dragon boat racing sport. It was initially developed and trained in Canada.

Execution 
In Germany the Hybrid Exit is being executed by the All Sports Team Hannover.

Advantages 

 less wind resistance, because the paddle is moved forward with the edge
 less up and down moving of the upper body
 higher frequencies with longer paddle stroke possible
 smoother boat move, less shaking
 faster forward move with the paddle possible
 boat high speed achieved per single stroke is being kept for a longer time
 longer stroke in general
 less risk to hit waves created by the paddler in front
 less impact of the inner arm shoulder
 less sprinkles

External links 
Dragon Boat Technical Coaching Manual, Page 43

Dragon boat racing